Rava idli (also rave idli) is a variation of the popular South Indian breakfast item idli, made with rava (coarase ground wheat or rice), bombay rava, semolina or rice rava.

History
It is a speciality of the state of Karnataka in India. It was invented by the popular restaurant chain, Mavalli Tiffin Rooms (MTR) of Bangalore. According to them, during World War II, when rice, which is the staple item used in idli, was in short supply, they experimented in making idli using semolina and created rava idli.

Rava idli translates to semolina idli in the Kannada language. It is usually found in restaurants that serve Udupi cuisine. Rava idli is served hot and is to be eaten along with saagu and coconut chutney. A dash of ghee poured on the top of rava idli adds to the overall taste.

See also
 Cuisine of Karnataka
 List of steamed foods

Notes

Karnataka cuisine